is a Japanese video game designer and producer. He is known for his work on Story of Seasons, formerly known as the Harvest Moon series. Despite acclaim and success from the series, he decided to no longer work on the series and focus on other projects in 2009.

Career 
Yasuhiro Wada was the producer of the 1995 Super Famicom game Magical Pop'n. He also worked as the designer on the game Harvest Moon. Harvest Moon is a farming game, with gameplay that is not focused on combat or competition. Wada felt he needed to make games that were different from those of his predecessors, and he drew on his experience growing up in rural life.

In 2005, he was the president of Marvelous Interactive. In 2008, he was the Chief Commercial Officer of Marvelous Entertainment. In 2010, he joined Grasshopper Manufacture as COO. He then left Grasshopper and founded the company Toybox in 2011.

Wada was the producer for the game Birthdays are Beginnings.

He worked on the game Little Dragons Café. The game is a cafe-management and dragon-raising simulator.

Works

References

External links 

Japanese video game designers
Japanese video game producers
Year of birth missing (living people)
Living people